The 2015 North Tyneside Metropolitan Borough Council election took place on 7 May 2015 to one third of the members of North Tyneside Metropolitan Borough Council in England. This was on the same day as other local elections and the 2015 UK General Election.

All of the seats being contested were last contested in 2011, and these results are compared to the results of 2014.

Result

Council Composition
Prior to the election the composition of the council was:

After the election the composition of the council was:

Candidates by party

There are a total of 72 candidates standing across the 20 seats - an average of 3.6 in each ward. The Labour Party, Conservative Party and UK Independence Party are all fielding a full slate of 20 candidates. The Green Party are fielding 5 candidates, whilst there are 3 candidates representing the Liberal Democrats and the Trade Unionist and Socialist Coalition respectively. 1 candidate is representing the National Front.

Since the last local election in 2014, the number of candidates representing Labour, the Conservatives, UKIP and the TUSC was unchanged. The Green Party had an increase of 4 candidates, the National Front an increase of 1 candidate, whilst the Liberal Democrats had a decrease of 4 candidates.

Results by ward
The electoral division results listed below are based on the changes from the 2014 elections, not taking into account any mid-term by-elections or party defections.

Battle Hill

Benton

Camperdown

Chirton

Collingwood

Cullercoats

Howdon

Killingworth

Longbenton

Monkseaton North

Monkseaton South

Northumberland

Preston

Riverside

St. Mary's

Tynemouth

Valley

Wallsend

Weetslade

Whitley Bay

References

2015 English local elections
May 2015 events in the United Kingdom
2015
21st century in Tyne and Wear